Ildar Nailevich Gizatullin (born 2 November 1976) is a Russian professional football coach and a former player. He is an assistant manager with FC Neftekhimik Nizhnekamsk.

Club career
He played two seasons in the Russian Football National League for FC Neftekhimik Nizhnekamsk.

References

1976 births
Living people
Russian footballers
Association football midfielders
FC Neftekhimik Nizhnekamsk players